The 2017 Split local elections were held on 21 May and 4 June 2017 for the Mayor of Split and members of the Split city council. Ivo Baldasar, the 71st mayor who served from 2013 to 2017 ran for re-election to a second four-year term, ultimately finishing in 9th place with 0.80% of the vote in the first round. As no candidate won an absolute majority of the vote in the first round, a second round of elections was held on 4 June 2017 between the two highest-ranked candidates in terms of popular vote: Željko Kerum of the Croatian Civic Party, who was previously the 70th Mayor of Split from 2009 to 2013, and Andro Krstulović Opara of the Croatian Democratic Union. Krstulović Opara narrowly won the run-off taking 46.2% of the votes against 44.3% for Kerum. Turnout was 45.5% in the first round and 38.1% in the second round.

This was the third direct election for the mayor of Split (simultaneously held with elections for all other county prefects and mayors in Croatia) since the popular vote method was introduced in 2009, as previously those officials had been elected by their county or city assemblies and councils.

Mayoral election

Council election

See also
2017 Croatian local elections
List of mayors in Croatia
List of mayors of Split

References 

Split 2017
Split 2017
Split, Croatia
Split local
Split local
History of Split, Croatia